The Isu people are a subgroup of the Igbo people of southeast Nigeria.
In the pre-colonial era, the Igbo people were protected from external invasion by the dense forests of the region, which also had the effect of encouraging diversity. Thus as warriors the neighboring Owerri people looked down on the Isu people, who were traders.

Isuama is the name given to the south-central part of Igboland, which was a major source of slaves during the period of the trans-Atlantic slave trade.
The name has been carried across the Atlantic, where it is found in the name of Cuban society Carabali Isuama.
This name pays homage to the group's ancestry in the Isuama area of Igboland to the north of the Kalabari Ijaw people.
At one time the Isuama language was spoken in Cuba, but eventually it and other Cross River languages was displaced by the standard Abakua language called Brikamo.

As of September 2010 the traditional ruler of Amandugba, in the north of Isu Local Government Area of Imo State was Eze Innocent Ikejiofor. That month he asked his kinsmen in the United States to support the reelection bid of Governor Ikedi Ohakim in the elections due in April 2011.
Some of the Isu  people live on the Nwangele Local Government Area.
Their community holds the annual Igba-nta celebration, a tourist attraction.

References

Sources

Igbo subgroups
Ethnic groups in Nigeria